Landka is a mobile software development company focused on educational apps. Notable products include Back in Time, Kiwaka and Art Legacy.

History 
The Portuguese company was founded in 2010 and gained notability with its flagship product Back in Time, an education iPad app about world history. Back in Time was released in September 2011 and brought instant success to Landka, being featured in the App Store worldwide and reaching the top sales of iPad book apps in nearly 40 countries. This project won Landka a World Summit Award (UN based initiative) in Learning and Education and was later ported to Windows thanks to a partnership between Landka and Intel. Back in Time was distinguished by The New York Times and selected for the top 10 apps of the year.

Later developments included ThinkO, a brain-training game released in 2012 that reached the top1 downloaded apps in Brazil, and Kiwaka (2014), an educational game to teach children about astronomy developed in collaboration with ESA and ESO.

In 2015, Landka released Overpaint, an educational game about colors and Art Legacy, an education book app about the most relevant paintings in the history of art, that won the company another nomination for the World Summit Awards.

Apps

External links 
 Official website
 Product website
 App Store developer page

References 

Software companies of Portugal
Educational technology companies
Indie video game developers
Video game companies of Portugal